Radu Alexandru Negru (born 17 April  1999) is a Romanian footballer who plays as a defender for Liga I club FC U Craiova 1948.

Honours
FC U Craiova
Liga II: 2020–21
Liga III: 2019–20

References

External links

1999 births
Living people
Sportspeople from Craiova
Romanian footballers
Association football defenders
Liga I players
Liga II players
Liga III players
FC U Craiova 1948 players